North Carolina Highway 163 (NC 163) is a primary state highway in the U.S. state of North Carolina.  The highway serves as a direct route from West Jefferson towards Wilkesboro.

Route description
NC 163 is a two-lane mountain highway that traverses  from West Jefferson to NC 16.  The highway travels with gliding curves through the valley area, with nearby mountains including Mount Jefferson, Round Knob and Frenches Knob along its edges. A majority of the route parallels Beaver Creek down to its confluence with the South Fork New River.  At its eastern terminus, travelers can continue south on NC 16 to the Blue Ridge Parkway, located at Horse Gap, or continue down the mountain towards Wilkesboro.

The North Carolina Department of Transportation (NCDOT) measures average daily traffic volumes along many of the roadways it maintains. In 2016, average daily traffic volumes along NC 163 varied from 2,000 vehicles per day west of the Obids Creek crossing to 5,900 vehicles per day near its western terminus. No section of NC 163 is included with the National Highway System, a network of highways in the United States which serve strategic transportation facilities, nor does it connect to the system.

History
Established in 1961 as a new primary routing along an existing secondary road (SR 1002), from West Jefferson to near Horse Gap; little has changed since.

Junction list

References

External links

 
 NCRoads.com: N.C. 163

Transportation in Ashe County, North Carolina
163